Huston may refer to:

Places

United States
Huston Township, Blair County, Pennsylvania
Huston Township, Centre County, Pennsylvania
Huston Township, Clearfield County, Pennsylvania

People with given name
Huston Quin, former mayor of Louisville, Kentucky, United States
Huston Smith, American religious scholar
Huston Street, American retired baseball player

People with the surname
Anjelica Huston (born 1951), an American actress
Charlie Huston, writer
Danny Huston (born 1962), actor and director
Jack Huston (born 1982), English actor
John Huston (1906–1987), American actor, producer and director
Margo Huston, (February 12, 1943) American reporter
Nyjah Huston, American professional skateboarder 
Patrick Huston (born 1996), British archer
Perdita Huston, women's rights activist
Roger Huston (born 1942), harness race announcer
Tillinghast L' Hommedieu Huston (1867-1938), American businessman, owner of New York Yankees circa 1915
Tony Huston (born 1950), American actor
Walter Huston, (1883–1950), a Canadian-born American actor

See also 
 Houston (disambiguation)